Michelle Anches was a woman who claimed to be the Grand Duchess Tatiana Nikolaevna of Russia. 

The remains of all members of the Romanov family killed at Ekaterinburg in 1918, including Grand Duchess Tatiana, have been discovered and identified through DNA testing, confirming Anches was an imposter.

See also
Romanov impostors

Notes

Romanov impostors
Year of birth missing
1926 deaths